County Route 548 (CR 548) is a county highway in the U.S. state of New Jersey. The highway extends  from Delsea Drive (Route 47 in Maurice River Township to Route 49 in Upper Township.

Route description

CR 548 begins at an intersection with Route 47 in the community of Port Elizabeth in Maurice River Township, Cumberland County, heading east on two-lane undivided Broadway Avenue. The road passes homes before crossing CR 648 and becoming Weatherby Road. The route crosses an abandoned railroad line as it leaves Port Elizabeth and passes a patch of farmland before entering dense forests. CR 548 continues through the forests for several more miles as it enters Cape May County, briefly running through Dennis Township before crossing into Upper Township and passing through the Belleplain State Forest. CR 548 passes some farms and reaches an intersection with CR 605 before it comes to its eastern terminus at Route 49.

History
The entire route was initially part of the Cape May Way, an auto trail running from Camden to Cape May. County Route 548 used to continue farther west, following New Jersey Route 47 and Cumberland County Routes 670 and 649 to County Route 553 in Port Norris.

Major intersections

See also

References

External links

County Route 548

500-series county routes in New Jersey
Roads in Cape May County, New Jersey
Roads in Cumberland County, New Jersey